The 2020–21 BLNO is the 21st season of the Basketball League of Norway.

Format
The ten participating teams first played the regular season, that consisted in a round-robin schedule containing three rounds with every team playing each opponent at least once home and once away for a total of 27 matches.

At the end of the regular season, the top eight teams qualifyfor the playoffs.

Teams

Regular season

Standings

Source:

References

External links
Official Norwegian Basketball Federation website

BLNO
Norway
Basketball
Basketball